Domènec Sugrañes i Gras (12 December 1878 – 9 August 1938) was a Catalan modernist architect and  disciple of Antoni Gaudí. He succeeded him at the head of the works of the church of the Sagrada Família and finished the façade of the Nativity. Sugrañes held this charge during 10 years, from Gaudí's death in 1926 until 20 July 1936.

Biography
Gaudí met Sugrañes in 1905 during his last year at the school of architecture. Since then, he participated in most of Gaudí's works. In collaboration with Gaudí, Sugrañes decorated the Bellesguard house with seating banks in mosaic (1917). He also collaborated in the Casa Batlló and Casa Milà.

Sugrañes became close with Gaudí to the extent that the latter established him as his testamentary executor.

List of works 
 The Plaza Monumental de Barcelona in collaboration with Manuel Joaquim Raspall i Mayol (1913).
 "Casa Bonet", Salou, (1918).
 Buildings "Balmes 107-109", Barcelona (1922).
 Building Muntaner "147 - Rosselló 142", Barcelona (1928)
 Public school of the Piarists, Balmes street, Barcelona (1928).
 "Casa Pellicer", Reus (1928).
 Public school of Capellades (1931).
 Buildings Muntaner 193 - Londres 88-90 Barcelona (1932).

Notes

References 

 

Architects from Catalonia
Spanish ecclesiastical architects
Modernisme architects
People from Reus
1878 births
1938 deaths